Tsirananaclia is a genus of moth in the subfamily Arctiinae.

Species
Tsirananaclia formosa 	Griveaud, 1973
Tsirananaclia milloti 	Griveaud, 1964
Tsirananaclia sucini 	Griveaud, 1964
Tsirananaclia tripunctata 	Griveaud, 1964

References
Afromoths

Arctiinae
Moth genera